Restaurant Nora was a restaurant owned by chef Nora Pouillon in Washington, D.C. and was America's first certified organic restaurant.

Opening and early years
In 1979, self-taught chef Nora Pouillon opened Restaurant Nora on the corner of Florida Avenue and 21st in the DuPont Circle neighborhood. Journalist Sally Quinn and her late husband, Washington Post executive editor, Ben Bradlee were early patrons and financial backers of the restaurant. Quinn offered a piece of advice: “Don’t mention anything about being healthy and natural. That sounds so unappetizing. That sounds like hippie food.” Pouillon ignored it, making her organic ingredients the focus of the restaurant.

The early reviews for Nora's were mixed, with Robert Shoffner of the Washingtonian less than enthusiastic about Pouillon's food. In 1980, The Washington Post'''s Phyllis Richman noted that "the cooking has matured," calling Nora's "a sophisticated return to old-fashioned home cooking, with dishes from here and there but ingredients only from impeccable sources that raise their meats without chemicals."

By the early 1990s, Nora's became a destination for D.C’s media and political elite, particularly in the administration of President Bill Clinton. In 1996, Chef Nora was named U.S.A. Chef of the Year by the American Tasting Institute, and she published a cookbook, Cooking with Nora : seasonal menus from Restaurant Nora : healthy, light, balanced, and simple food with organic ingredients.

Organic certification
In the mid-1990s, Chef Nora began to investigate how Restaurant Nora could become an organic certified restaurant and learned that no certification process existed. She decided to set about creating those standards. She worked for two years with Oregon Tilth, a nonprofit membership organization dedicated to supporting and advocating organic food and farming. The Oregon Tilth Certified Organic Program was established in 1982 and is an Accredited Certifying Agent for the USDA’s National Organic Program.
The resulting standard required that 95 percent of the food used, as a certified restaurant, must be obtained from USDA certified organic sources. “This meant obtaining proof of organic certification from all our suppliers,” she says. Chef Nora complied with the lengthy requirements, and in 1999 Nora's became the first certified organic restaurant in the country.

Later years and closure
By the early 2000s, the restaurant was a fixture in Washington's dining scene, being named among Washingtonian'' magazine's "Very Best Restaurants." In 2016, Nora's was one of the approximately 100 restaurants reviewed in the first Michelin Guide for Washington, D.C.

Restaurant Nora closed in June 2017, upon Chef Nora's retirement. She was awarded a Lifetime Achievement Award by the James Beard Foundation, celebrating her career at the restaurant.

Notable patrons and events
Restaurant Nora has held lunches, dinners, and events for dignitaries, congressional members and White House administrations, and was a favorite of Hillary Clinton. In 1993, President Bill Clinton held his first inaugural party at the restaurant. Many of Clinton's cabinet members and staff ate at Nora's in the 90s, and Vice President Al Gore and Tipper Gore celebrated her 45th birthday at the restaurant.

President Jimmy Carter and Nancy Reagan also ate at Nora's. Asked about her Presidential patrons in The Washington Post, Pouillon said: “Neither of the Bush presidents ever set foot in Nora’s, but Laura Bush came, along with her two daughters,” Pouillon announces proudly. “Good food, it seems, is also bipartisan.”

In January 2010, President Barack Obama held a surprise birthday party for First Lady Michelle Obama at the restaurant.

References

Restaurants in Washington, D.C.
Dupont Circle
Organic food